or  is a lake in the municipality of Røyrvik in Trøndelag county, Norway.  The  lake lies just south of the large lake Namsvatnet into which it drains.

See also
 List of lakes in Norway

References

Lakes of Trøndelag
Røyrvik